The Black Hand Gang is a 1930 British comedy film directed by Monty Banks and starring Wee Georgie Wood, Viola Compton and Alfred Wood. It was made by British International Pictures and based on a play by Black Hand George by Bert Lee and R.P. Weston. Shot at Elstree Studios as a quota quickie, it was released as a second feature.

Cast
 Wee Georgie Wood – Georgie Robinson
 Viola Compton – Mother
 Alfred Wood – Father
 Dolly Harmer – Mrs. Robinson
 Violet Young – Winnie
 Lionel Hoare – The Other Man
 Junior Banks – Archibald

References

Bibliography
Chibnall, Steve. Quota Quickies: The Birth of the British 'B' Film. British Film Institute, 2007.

External links

1930 films
British comedy films
1930 comedy films
1930s English-language films
Films directed by Monty Banks
British films based on plays
Quota quickies
Films shot at British International Pictures Studios
British black-and-white films
1930s British films